Chapman High School is a public secondary school in Chapman, Kansas, United States.  It is the sole high school operated by Chapman USD 473 school district.  The mascot for CHS athletic teams is the Fighting Irish.  Students come to CHS from Chapman Middle School which is fed by elementary schools throughout Dickinson County, Kansas.  There are four other districts in Dickinson County

History

Originally named Dickinson County Community High School, the high school was established in 1889 as the nation's first county high school.

In 1961, a second high school was completed, which replaced the 1880s school. In 1966, USD 473 was created by the merging of 11 grade schools and this high school.  There were 105 teachers and 1,736 students in the district.  At this time, the school was renamed Chapman High School with 530 students.

On June 11, 2008 at 10:22 Wednesday night, a massive tornado ripped through Chapman.  It caused extensive damage to all of the USD 473 public schools in addition to damaging or destroying 60-80% of the homes in Chapman.  About 80% of the structured High School sustained some form of damage with numerous structures being destroyed.  Two months after the tornado devastated Chapman, the 2008-2009 school year began without delay.

In 2011, the third high school was completed, which replaced the 1961 school that was damaged by the tornado.

In 2011, the University of Notre Dame contacted the high school because the illegal use of its registered trademark and the "Fighting Irish" logo.  Chapman High School has used the "Fighting Irish" logo since 1967. Its publications are called the "Emerald" and "Shamrock", the four-leaf clover is distinct on the school's website, it has a Fighting Irish library, and the Fighting Leprechaun mascot was put on the sign in front the school.  Notre Dame requested that Chapman High School limited its use of the "leprechaun" and require the text "Chapman High School" included on all items that it sells.  The district has decided to launch a contest to design a new mascot and logo.  The deadline to submit entries is December 1, 2011. A committee will determine the top 5 suggestions which were put to a vote in January 2012. The school retained the fighting Irish mascot, although a new logo was announced and unveiled on February 10, 2012.

Academics

In 2013, Chapman High School was selected as a Blue Ribbon School. The Blue Ribbon Award recognizes public and private schools which perform at high levels or have made significant academic improvements. In addition, principal Suther was awarded the Terrel Bell Award.

Activities 
Chapman High School has an extensive fine arts program involving drama and music.  The drama department offers several theatrical productions every school year as well as a competitive Forensics team that travels to festivals throughout the state.

The music department provides opportunities for students in vocal as well as instrumental music.  In addition to many concerts and performances throughout the year the department also produces an annual event for seniors to showcase their talents at Class Night.  This CHS tradition began in 1926 and has grown from a simple senior night get together to the production it is today.  In the summer of the year 2017 the Chapman Irish Marching Band will be marching in the independence day parade in Washington D.C the Chapman Irish Marching Band was the only marching in the state of Kansas to be nominated to represent the state of Kansas.

Ten recognized student organizations are currently chartered at CHS.  These include AFG, AFS Intercultural Programs, Future Farmers of America, FCCLA, Hi-Y, National Honor Society, SADD, Student Council, FBLA Future Business Leaders of America, and Tri-M Music Honor Society.  The National Hi-Y Organization can trace its roots back to Chapman as the first ever Hi-Y charter was granted to DCCHS.

The chapter of the Future Farmers of America has been recognized at the state and national levels, holding the record for the most wins of the Bob Garlow Triple Crown award, which is given to the top FFA chapter in the state of Kansas.

Athletics 
CHS fields 15 teams that compete in 11 different sports.  Chapman is classified as a 4A  school and competes in the North Central Kansas League (NCKL) since 1966 

The Chapman football team and its rival Abilene High School share a special distinction as being the oldest high school rivalry west of the Mississippi River.  The two teams first competed against each other in 1892, making the rivalry over 115 years old.

Since joining the NCKL in 1966, the Chapman Football team has won 10 league championships, with 7 of those being outright championships.  During that time, only Marysville has had more championships than Chapman.  Marysville can boast 15 league championships with 10 being outright.

Coach NeVoy Hettenbach was at the helm for 6 of the Chapman's league championships.  Since 1966, only 1 NCKL coach has more league championships than Coach Hettenbach.  That coach being Paul Dennis of Abilene, but only 3 of his championships were outright compared to 5 of Coach Hettenbach's trophies.

Fall
 Football
 Cross Country
 Girls Tennis
 Volleyball
 Spirit Squad
 Marching Band

Winter
 Basketball
 Wrestling
 Pep Band
 Scholars Bowl

Spring
 Baseball
 Golf
 Boys Tennis
 Softball
 Track and Field

NCKL Football Championships

State Championships 
Chapman High School have won a total 35 of state championships.

Notable alumni 
 Joseph Henry Engle - Space Shuttle Astronaut
 DeShawn Fogle - NFL Football Player

See also
 Tornadoes of 2008
 List of high schools in Kansas
 List of unified school districts in Kansas

References

External links 
School
 School Website
 District Website
Historical
 History of Chapman High School
Maps
 USD 473 School District Boundary Map, KDOT
 Chapman City Map, KDOT

Educational institutions established in 1889
Public high schools in Kansas
Schools in Dickinson County, Kansas
1889 establishments in Kansas